The Most Reverend James O'Fallon (bef 1756 – 2 Dec 1786) was an Irish Roman Catholic clergyman who served as the Bishop of Elphin from 1756 to 1786.

References

Roman Catholic bishops of Elphin
Year of birth unknown
1786 deaths
1756 births